Quintus Veranius (died AD 57) was a distinguished Roman general around the mid-first century CE. He was III vir monetalis, tribune of Legio IV Scythica and quaestor under Tiberius. He was appointed tribune of the plebs in 41 and praetor in 42. In 43, the Emperor Claudius constituted the new province of Lycia, and appointed Veranius as its governor. He governed the province until 48, and during this period put down the rebellion of Cilicia Trachea. He served as consul in 49, and was elevated to patrician status by Claudius, who also appointed him as an augur.

Veranius became governor of Britain in 57, replacing Aulus Didius Gallus. He reversed Didius's policy of maintaining existing borders and began military operations against the troublesome Silures in what is now Wales, but died within a year. In his will he flattered Nero and claimed that, had he had another two years, he would have conquered the whole of the island. He was replaced by Gaius Suetonius Paulinus, and the speed with which Suetonius took Wales suggests that Veranius had already done much of the work. Onasander, a Greek philosopher, dedicated his Strategikos, a treatise on generalship, to Veranius, at some point between his consulship (49) and death (57/58).

References

Primary sources
Tacitus, Agricola 14; Tacitus, Annals 12:5,

Secondary sources
 Anthony R. Birley, The Roman Government of Britain (Oxford 2005) 37-43.

Further reading 
 Arthur E. Gordon. Quintus Veranius, Consul A.D. 49. Berkeley: University of California Press, 1952.

External links 
 Quintus Veranius at Roman-Britain.org 
 Lycia: People and Places at Encyclopedia of the Roman Provinces

57 deaths
Roman governors of Lycia et Pamphylia
Imperial Roman consuls
Roman governors of Britain
Augurs of the Roman Empire
Ancient Romans in Britain
1st-century Romans
Year of birth unknown
Veranii